Yaa Asantewaa I (born October 17, 1840 – October 17, 1921) was the Queen Mother of Ejisu in the Ashanti Empire, now part of modern-day Ghana. She was appointed by her brother Nana Akwasi Afrane Opese, the Edwesuhene, or ruler, of Edwesu. In 1900, she led the Ashanti war also known as the War of the Golden Stool, or the Yaa Asantewaa War of Independence, against the British Empire.

Biography
Yaa Asantewaa was born in 1840 in Besease, the daughter of Kwaku Ampoma and Ata Po. Her brother, Afrane Panin, became the chief of Edweso, a nearby community. After a childhood without incident, she cultivated crops on the land around Boankra. She entered a polygamous marriage with a man from Kumasi, with whom she had a daughter.

She died in exile in the Seychelles in 1921. She was a successful farmer and mother. She was an intellectual, a politician, a human rights activist, a queen and a war leader. Yaa Asantewaa became famous for commanding the Ashanti Kings in the War of the Golden Stool, against British colonial rule, to defend and protect the sovereign independence of the Golden Stool.

Prelude to rebellion
During her brother's reign, Yaa Asantewaa saw the Ashanti Confederacy go through a series of events that threatened its future, including a civil war from 1883 to 1888. When her brother died in 1894, Yaa Asantewaa used her right as Queen Mother to nominate her own grandson as Ejisuhene. When the British exiled him to the Seychelles in 1896, along with the King of Asante Prempeh I and other members of the Asante government, Yaa Asantewaa became regent of the Ejisu–Juaben district. After the exile of PrempehI, the British governor-general of the Gold Coast, Frederick Hodgson, demanded the Golden Stool, the symbol of the Asante nation. This request led to a secret meeting of the remaining members of the Asante government at Kumasi, to discuss how to secure the return of their king. There was a disagreement among those present on how to go about this. Yaa Asantewaa, who was present at this meeting, stood and addressed the members of the council with these words:

To dramatize her determination to go to war she seized a gun and fired a shot in front of the men.

Yaa Asantewaa was chosen by a number of regional Asante kings to be the war-leader of the Asante fighting force. This is the first and only example for a woman to be given that role in Asante history. The Ashanti-British War of the Golden Stool – also known as the "Yaa Asantewaa War" – was led by Queen Mother Nana Yaa Asantewaa with an army of 5,000.

The rebellion and its aftermath
 Beginning in March 1900, the rebellion laid siege to the fort at Kumasi where the British had sought refuge. The fort still stands today as the Kumasi Fort and Military Museum. After several months, the Gold Coast governor eventually sent a force of 1,400 to quell the rebellion. During the fighting, Queen Yaa Asantewaa and fifteen of her closest advisers were captured, and they, too, were sent into exile to the Seychelles. The rebellion represented the final war in the Anglo-Asante series of wars that lasted throughout the 19thcentury. On 1 January 1902 the British finally annexed the territory that the Asante Empire had been controlling for almost a century, and the Asante was transformed a protectorate of the British crown.

Nana Yaa Asantewaa died in exile in the Seychelles on 17 October 1921. Three years after her death, on 17 December 1924, 
King PrempehI and the other remaining members of the exiled Asante court were allowed to return to Asante. 
King PrempehI made sure that the remains of Nana Asantewaa and the other exiled Asantes were returned for a proper royal burial. Queen Asantewaa's dream for an Asante independent from colonial rule was realized on 6 March 1957, when the Asante protectorate gained independence as part of Ghana. Ghana was the first African nation in West Africa to achieve this feat.

Social roles of Asante women
Nana Yaa Asantewaa understood the ramifications of British colonial rule. She is seen by Ghanaians today as a queen mother who exercised her political and social clout to help defend her kingdom. The role she played in influencing the Ashanti men to battle the British appears to be a function of her matriarchal status. Nana Yaa Asantewaa's call upon the women of the Asante Empire is based on the political obligations of Akan women and their respective roles in legislative and judicial processes. The hierarchy of male stools among the Akan people was complemented by female counterparts. Within the village, elders who were heads of the matrilineages (mpanyimfo), constituted the village council known as the ôdekuro. The women, known as the mpanyinfo, and referred to as aberewa or ôbaa panyin, were responsible for looking after women's affairs. For every ôdekuro, an ôbaa panyin acted as the responsible party for the affairs of the women of the village and served as a member of the village council.

The head of a division, the ôhene, and the head of the autonomous political community, the Amanhene, had their female counterparts known as the ôhemaa: a female ruler who sat on their councils. The ôhemaa and ôhene were all of the same mogya, blood or localized matrilineage. The occupant of the female stool in Kumasi state, the Asantehemaa, the united Asante, since her male counterpart was ex-officio of the Asanthene, was a member of the Kôtôkô Council, the Executive Committee or Cabinet of the Asanteman Nhyiamu, General Assembly of Asante rulers. Female stool occupants participated not only in the judicial and legislative processes, but also in the making and unmaking of war, and the distribution of land.

Place in history and cultural legacy
Yaa Asantewaa remains a much-loved figure in Asante history and the history of Ghana as a whole for her role in confronting the colonialism of the British. She is immortalized in song as follows:

To highlight the importance of encouraging more female leaders in Ghanaian society, the Yaa Asantewaa Girls' Secondary School was established at Kumasi in 1960 with funds from the Ghana Education Trust.

In the year 2000, a week-long centenary celebration was held in Ghana to acknowledge Yaa Asantewaa's accomplishments. As part of these celebrations, a museum was dedicated to her at Kwaso in the Ejisu–Juaben District on 3 August 2000. Unfortunately, a fire on 23 July 2004 destroyed several historical items, including her sandals and battle dress (batakarikese) seen in the photograph above. The current Queen-mother of Ejisu is Yaa AsantewaaII. A second Yaa Asantewaa festival was held 1–5 August 2006 in Ejisu.

The Yaa Asantewaa Centre in Maida Vale, west London, is an African–Caribbean arts and community centre. It took its name in 1986.

A television documentary by Ivor Agyeman-Duah, entitled Yaa AsantewaaThe Exile of King Prempeh and the Heroism of An African Queen, premiered in Ghana in 2001.

A stage show written by Margaret Busby, Yaa Asantewaa: Warrior Queen, directed by Geraldine Connor and featuring master drummer Kofi Ghanaba, with a pan-African cast, toured the UK and Ghana in 2001–02. A radio drama by the same author was also serialized in five episodes (13–17 October 2003) on BBC Radio Four's Woman's Hour, the cast including Glenna Forster-Jones and Jack Klaff, directed by Pam Fraser Solomon, with music by Nana Tsiboe, Kofi-Adu, Jojo Yates, Asebre Quaye and Atongo Zimba.

The album from British jazz troupe Sons of Kemet, Your Queen Is a Reptile, names songs after both contemporary and historical influential black women. Asantewaa's name was used for the seventh track, "My Queen is Yaa Asantewaa".

Festival 
For details see Yaa Asantewaa Festival

Further reading
 Ivor Agyeman-Duah, Yaa Asantewaa: The Heroism of an African Queen, Accra, Ghana: Centre for Intellectual Renewal, 1999.
 Nana Arhin Brempong (Kwame Arhin), "The Role of Nana Yaa Asantewaa in the 1900 Asante War of Resistance", Ghana Studies 3, 2000, pp. 97–110.

References

External links

1840s births
1921 deaths
African women in war
Women rulers in Africa
Ghanaian royalty
African queen mothers
Women in war 1900–1945
Ashanti independence activists
20th-century women rulers
Deaths in Seychelles